The Halsey Institute of Contemporary Art (HICA or "the Halsey") is a non-profit, non-collecting contemporary art institute within the School of the Arts at the College of Charleston in Charleston, South Carolina. The HICA presents contemporary art exhibitions by emerging or mid-career artists. The Halsey is housed in the Marion and Wayland H. Cato Jr. Center for the Arts at 161 Calhoun Street, in the heart of downtown Charleston. The Halsey features two gallery spaces, the Deborah A. Chalsty Gallery and the South Gallery, which includes a total of  3,000 sq. feet in exhibition space. Mark Sloan was Director and Chief Curator of the Halsey from 1994 - 2020. Katie Hirsch became the director in April 2021.

In addition to exhibitions, the Halsey presents a publishing program, visiting-artist lectures, an extensive membership program, a reference library, film screenings, and an educational outreach program.

History

The Halsey Institute was originally named the Halsey Gallery for the artist William Halsey, an accomplished Charleston native whose modernist works were exhibited at the Museum of Modern Art, the Whitney Museum of American Art, the Art Institute of Chicago, and the Metropolitan Museum of Art, to note a few. Halsey was the first individual to teach a studio art course at the College of Charleston beginning in 1964, and he continued to teach here for twenty years. Upon his retirement in 1984, the Studio Art faculty voted to name the art gallery after him to honor his contribution to the arts in Charleston. Mr. Halsey died in 1999, the same year he was awarded the Elizabeth O’Neill Verner Award.

Halsey’s wife, Corrie McCallum was also an artist. In addition to her body of work, Corrie McCallum made significant contributions to the Charleston art community as an educator. She was the first artist to teach printmaking at the College of Charleston. Under her guidance, the Gibbes Museum of Art conducted the first comprehensive art appreciation program for Charleston County public school students. She held education positions at several institutions, including the Telfair Museum of Art in Savannah and the Gibbes Museum of Art, College of Charleston, and Newberry College in South Carolina. Throughout her life, she remained an outspoken advocate for the visual arts, and was awarded the Elizabeth O’Neill Verner Award in 2003. Eventually, she died in 2009.

Since 1984, the gallery bearing the Halsey name has presented exhibitions by regional, national, and international artists. In 2005, the gallery changed its name to the Halsey Institute of Contemporary Art to more accurately reflect the range of programming produced. The Halsey Institute hosts between five and seven exhibitions per year, highlighting adventurous contemporary art by emerging and mid-career artists of national stature. All exhibitions are accompanied by educational programming. In addition, the Halsey Institute has maintained a strong international component over the years, bringing in artists from all over the world for residencies, lectures, and exhibitions.

In 2009, the Halsey Institute moved into an expanded gallery space in the newly constructed Marion and Wayland H. Cato Jr. Center, anchoring the first floor of the new arts building. In 2012, the South Carolina Arts Commission presented the Halsey Institute the Elizabeth O’Neill Verner Award with special recognition to director Mark Sloan. This is the highest honor the state gives in the arts. In 2018, Charleston Mayor John Tecklenburg declared March 14 as William Halsey and Corrie McCallum Day in Charleston.

Programming

Exhibitions
The Halsey regularly features emerging, mid-career, and "oddly overlooked" artists. Over its history, HICA has produced more than 275 exhibitions and showing work from more than 2,000 artists. The Halsey organizes five to seven exhibitions a year, each with accompanying programming. Behind-the-scenes videos are often commissioned to accompany an exhibition, giving visitors an in-depth view into the life and working method of an exhibiting artist. The Halsey originates the vast majority of its exhibitions, occasionally collaborating with other institutions. Many HICA exhibitions continue with national tours following their debut in Charleston.

Southbound: Photographs of and about the New South
In the fall of 2018, the Halsey Institute presented Southbound: Photographs of and about the New South. This is a photography exhibition co-curated by Mark Sloan and Mark Long of the College of Charleston.

Southbound comprises fifty-six photographers’ visions of the South over the first decades of the twenty-first century. Photographers included in this exhibition include:

 Shelby Lee Adams 
 Rob Amberg
 Daniel Beltrá
 Rachel Boillot
 Sheila Pree Bright
 Lucinda Bunnen
 Keith Calhoun and Chandra McCormick
 Langdon Clay, Maude Schuyler Clay
 Thomas Daniel
 Eliot Dudik 
 Matt Eich
 Lisa Elmaleh
 Mitch Epstein
 McNair Evans
 Lucas Foglia
 Kyle Ford
 Preston Gannaway
 Alex Harris
 John Lusk Hathaway
 Titus Brooks Heagins
 Lauren Henkin
 Timothy Hursley
 Jessica Ingram
 Will Jacks, Daniel Kariko
 Tommy Kha, Kevin Kline
 Stacy Kranitz
 Gillian Laub
 Deborah Luster
 Tammy Mercure
 Jeanine Michna-Bales
 Greg Miller
 Susana Raab
 Tom Rankin
 Tamara Reynolds
 Jeff Rich
 Eugene Richards
 Kathleen Robbins
 Euphus Ruth
 Anderson Scott
 Jerry Siegel
 David Simonton
 Christopher Sim 
 Mike Smith
 Magdalena Solé
 Bill Steber
 Mark Steinmetz
 Brandon Thibodeaux
 Burk Uzzle
 Sofia Valiente
 Michelle Van Parys
 Jeff Whetstone
 Susan Worsham

International Artist-In-Residence Program
The Halsey Institute of Contemporary Art hosts an artist-in-residence every year, for the period of a few weeks to several months.  During their residencies, artists have the unique opportunity to work on-site to produce new works of art to be exhibited at the Halsey Institute. The artist in-residence engages with the local community through lectures, workshops and other public events. The Halsey aims to give the community insight to the artist's life, their work and their creative processes. The Halsey Institute often produces an exhibition video about each artist as well as publications such as exhibition catalogues for each artist-in-residency. Past artists-in-residence include Chen Long-bin, Tiebena Dagnogo, Eames Demetrios, Rikuo Ueda, Motoi Yamamoto, Hung Liu, Lonnie Holley, Renee Stout, Jumaadi, Kendall Messick, and Patricia Boinest Potter, among others.

In the spring of 2013, the Halsey Institute commissioned Taiwanese artist Chen Long-bin to create a site-specific sculpture to be installed at the College of Charleston in association with the exhibition Rebound: Dissections and Excavations in Book Art at the Halsey Institute, which included other artists working with books or paper as the primary medium. For his installation, Chen used printed material found in the community, such as magazines, telephone books, and other cultural debris of the information society in which we live. Aided by a group of College of Charleston students and faculty, Chen worked on campus to create sculptural elements that mimicked a traditional Zen garden. Instructed to nail thousands of books together, Chen's team of assistants created forms that were then carved down by the artist, transformed into replicas of stones and other natural forms one would find in a Zen garden. The finished installation, entitled Set in Stone: Zen Garden, was located in the rotunda of the Addlestone Library at the College of Charleston. The exhibition and installation were presentations of the 2013 Spoleto Festival USA in Charleston.

The Halsey Institute hosted artist Tiebena Dagnogo for forty-five days in the fall of 1998 through an international artist-in-residence program funded by the United States Information Agency. The resulting exhibition, entitled Memory Speaks, was on view from October 2 to 31, 1998. Born in Roubaix, France, Dagnogo now lives and works in Abidjan, Ivory Coast, creating art that links "sculpture, painting, and all traditional forms of African expression." The artist's work displays a keen sense of place within the ritual-object traditions of his adopted home, yet it also extends into the Western tradition of abstraction. Using tribal artifacts as inspiration, Dagnogo forges hybrid art forms that incorporate history and memory within a broader aesthetic tradition. Loosely geometric and textural, the works feature earth tones that call upon the natural landscapes of Ivory Coast.
For this exhibition, Dagnogo made use of both recycled and new wood to create the panels he painted upon. As he viewed it, old wood was "full of history." For that old wood, and for the newer piece of wood he incorporated into his work, he has provided a new story. The exhibition included both works created in Dagnogo's studio in Abidjan as well as those made during his residency in Charleston.

Eames Demetrios, artist and self-described "Geographer-at-Large," was the Halsey's 2011 Quattlebaum Artist-in-Residence. During Demetrios' residency, visitors were invited into an alternative universe he had created called Kcymaerxthaere. As the artist described it, "One can think of Kcymaerxthaere as an illuminated manuscript where every page is in a different location and some of the illumination is provided by the sensation of being in that place—or even the knowledge of it being in that place." The Kcymaerxthaere universe constructed by Demetrios consists of more than ninety installations spread throughout eighteen countries. This exhibition represented the first time Demetrios had shown his project in a gallery space, allowing it to transcend boundaries and be viewed in a new way. Included in the exhibition were photographs, maps, and a glossary of terms for the viewers' reference.  After listening to the Kcymaerxthaere stories, African women embroidered squares of fabric based on scenes from those stories. Outside the Halsey galleries, the exhibition continued with three permanent plaques placed in and around Charleston, with one in the Charleston Harbor, forty feet beneath the surface. 

Japanese artist Rikiuo Ueda was the Halsey's fall 2002 International Artist-in-Residence. The Halsey commissioned Ueda to produce work using his masterfully engineered devices that allow for natural elements and mechanics to play a part in the art-making process. Also included in this exhibition, Ueda's "wind drawings" were created using mechanical devices that harness the wind, transferring its energy onto paper, canvas, and other surfaces selected by the artist. The resulting compositions created show "the natural interaction between the wind and the mind." One of his sculptures, titled "tea house in the sky," was located outside for public viewing in the courtyard of the Halsey after his residency. This two-story tea house made entirely of bamboo was the location from which Ueda conceived of his wind paintings. Ueda's work "allow for a humorous, yet profound interpretation of human ability to invent technologies to chart and control nature".

In the summer of 2012, the Halsey Institute of Contemporary Art hosted Japanese artist Motoi Yamamoto as its artist-in-residence. The centerpiece of Motoi's exhibition, entitled Return to the Sea: Saltworks, was a site-specific installation at HICA. Made entirely from salt, Yamamoto painstakingly created a complex and geometrical labyrinth inside the Halsey gallery. Within Japanese culture, salt is known as a symbol for purification and mourning. Salt's significance is very personal to Yamamoto: in 1994 his sister passed away at the age of twenty-four from brain cancer.  In an effort to preserve his memories of his sister and all he had lost with her passing, Yamamoto forged a connection with salt and began creating work that reflected his grief. In addition to the site-specific installation, Yamamoto also exhibited photography and sketchbooks. The Halsey Institute produced multiple exhibition videos, which included interviews with Japanese art curators who discussed Yamamoto's work and gave the audience a glimpse into Yamamoto's studio, "providing insight into his creative process."  The Halsey Institute published a color catalogue documenting the artist's saltworks around the world, made over the course fourteen years. The catalogue includes essays by Mark Sloan, director and senior curator of the Halsey Institute, and Mark Kurlansky, author of the New York Times best seller Salt: A World History. Upon the closing of the exhibition, the Halsey invited hundreds of people from the community to take part in a ceremonious disassembling of the primary installation. The salt collected from the gallery was then brought to the Charleston Harbor and returned to the sea. This exhibition, organized by the Halsey, premiered in Charleston and traveled across the United States. This exhibition was a featured presentation of the 2012 Spoleto Festival USA.

Hung Liu is a Chinese-born, California-based artist. For the 1998 Piccolo Spoleto invitational exhibition, the Halsey Institute commissioned her to create an installation specifically related to the history of the Chinese immigrants in Charleston, South Carolina. As she has done in other cities, Liu researched the China connection throughout the region and created a response based on her findings. From this, she learned that Chinese immigrants in the nineteenth and twentieth centuries had roots in the laundry business all over the Charleston area during the 1940s. In response, Liu transformed the Halsey Gallery into a "ghost" 1940s Chinese laundry operation, incorporating objects such as irons, models of washing machines, clothing line strung throughout the gallery, and handmade Chinese garments made specifically in China for this installation. The exhibition also featured several of the artist's recent paintings. As a Chinese immigrant herself, Hung Liu understands that the transition from East to West is as much a struggle to maintain ones cultural identity as it is a shift in geography and customs. Using the Chinese laundry as a point of reference, the artist follows the trail of these immigrants into this new place and creates a space in which their stories can be told.

Kevin Kelly presented his exhibition "Hunter's Paradise Found" during his 1999 residency at the Halsey. 
For this exhibition, Canadian artist Kevin Kelly challenged the audience to consider the semantics of natural history museums. Kelly constructed dioramas which he termed "pseudo-natural habitats." Kelly deliberately defied the boundaries of the traditional natural history dioramas by inviting the viewer to enter the space, thereby becoming a living specimen in the reconstructed landscape. Kelly's work asks us what happens when we dissect or re-create nature in an artificial setting?

In early 2015, the Halsey Institute featured artist Patricia Boinest Potter as artist-in-residence. While largely abstract in formal terms, the work she creates also defies traditional categories within the art canon. With an extensive background in architecture, Potter's enigmatic art takes the form of three-dimensional maps, referred to as Isomorphic Map Tables and 1:1 Map Insets". For Patterns of Place, Potter included a series of six Isomorphic Map Tables and one hundred 1:1 Map Insets representing a one-hundred-mile stretch of northern Alabama, where she now resides. This exhibition was curated by Mark Sloan, director and chief curator of the Halsey. In association with this exhibition, the Halsey Institute produced a video on the artist and also published a 120-page color catalogue. After debuting at the Halsey Institute in Charleston, Patricia Boinest Potter's Patterns of Place traveled for several years throughout the United States. This project was funded in part by the South Carolina Arts Commission, which receives support from the National Endowment for the Arts.

In 2007, The Halsey invited photographer Kendall Messick for this artist-in-residency. The exhibition, entitled The Projectionist, was a multi- media installation that included the documentary film that Messick produced and directed, documentary photographs as well as the set in which is featured in the film - "The Shalimar Theatre". This documentary chronicles the life of Gordon Brinkle, who fascination for the movie theaters of the past inspired him to recreate his very own theater in the basement of his Delaware home. Using parts from the original theatre, "The Shalimar Theatre" was reconstructed on the Halsey premises and shared with the public. Compelled by the stories of aging individuals often overlooked today, Messick photographed Gordon Brinkle for nearly six years until the projectionist died in 2007. Following this exhibition, Mark Sloan, director and chief curator of the Halsey Institute, contributed an essay to the Messick's catalogue about the Projectionist discussing his photographic work.

American artist and musician Lonnie Holley was the Halsey Institute's fall 2015 artist-in-residence. During Holley's residency, the Halsey presented a multifaceted showcase of the artist's work. This extensive project included an exhibition, concert, exhibition video, and monographic catalogue. The forty works featured in this exhibition were selected from Holley's personal collection, on loan from the William S. Arnett collection and the Souls Grown Deep Foundation. Holley's art, spontaneous and improvisational in nature, was born out of a need to collect found objects from a very young age and to transform them into objects of his own creation. Raised in Birmingham, Alabama, Holley was one of twenty-seven children. His work is autobiographical in nature. Holley repurposes everyday objects, discarded and unwanted debris, into sculptures that signify the renewal of art and life as well as rebirth and transformation. 
 In addition to creating art on-site, Lonnie Holley worked with several K-12 schools in the Charleston County School District as well as with students at the College of Charleston. This project was supported in part by the Friends of the Library at the College of Charleston, as well as by grants from the National Endowment for the Arts and the Elizabeth Firestone Graham Foundation. This exhibition was also included in the MOJA Arts Festival, presented by the City of Charleston Office of Cultural Affairs.
In association with his exhibition at HICA, Lonnie Holley performed live at the Charleston Music Hall. His music, much like his artwork, represents a culmination of styles yet is uniquely his own. With elements of jazz, electronica, blues, and spoken word, Holley offered the audience a look into his thought processes and their products. Holley's one-of-a kind approach has attracted the interest of many other musicians and he has collaborated with members of the Black Keys, Arcade Fire, and the Shins.

The 2014 exhibition forgive me not to miss you not featured works by Jumaadi created during his two-month residency at the Halsey Institute of Contemporary Art and was the artist's first-ever exhibition in North America. Born in Indonesia, Jumaadi currently divides his time between Australia and the Netherlands. Jumaadi is known to work with a range of mediums that includes drawing, painting, sculpture, installations, and shadow puppets. Through the use of a mystical creature he has invented, Jumaadi's art serves as a commentary on human and animal nature. During his residency in Charleston, Jumaadi held workshops with Academic Magnet High School students to teach them about the art of shadow puppetry and create their very own shadow-puppet theater, which was presented at the school. Support for this residency and exhibition was granted by the Quattlebaum Endowment as well as the E. Rhodes and Leona B. Carpenter Foundation.

The Halsey invited artist Renee Stout to have a residency in Charleston in October 1996. Renee Stout created and exhibited a "juke joint" reminiscent of the one the artist knew in her native Pittsburgh, Pennsylvania on the first floor the Halsey Gallery. The "Wylie Avenue Juke" exhibition applied themes of blues music, jazz and African-American culture. She believed that blues music is one of the primary vehicles to convey African cultural traditions into American culture. Through a grant from the National Endowment for the Arts, Renee Stout also worked with Charleston County high school students to create a site-specific assemblage sculpture that was placed on the student grounds of the high school. The African American Artist-In-Residence Program was a collaborative effort between the Halsey Gallery, the Avery Research Center of the College of Charleston and the Charleston County School district. Her residency took place in the month of February 1996 to coincide with Black History Month.

In 2008 the Halsey Institute welcomed Florida artist Richard McMahan to its artist-in-residency program. McMahan has been amassing what he calls his minimuseum for more than twenty years. Contained in his museum are tiny replicas, each about the size of a baseball card, of some of the most celebrated works in the history of art. During his exhibition at the Halsey, McMahan presented more than eleven hundred works of art that ranged in style from cave art to contemporary art. When asked by a local newspaper about his process, McMahan provided details: "I use 100 percent recycled materials: cardboard, paper. The frames are made from manila folders treated with glue and string. Sometimes I use plastic to simulate glass. When I'm ready to frame, I put fingernail polish on the painting. It brings out the color." The Halsey Institute worked with the Clemson Architecture Center in Charleston to design and build the walls for the exhibition. After weeks of collaboration, the two institutions decided upon a final concept, which was a large-scale, continuous winding and overlapping wall on which McMahan's work was displayed. Minimuseum was presented in the rotunda at the Addlestone Library at the College of Charleston as a feature of the 2008 Spoleto Festival USA.

Looking To See Tours
Established in 2010 and supported by The Henry and Sylvia Yaschik Foundation, HICA Looking to See program's free tours provide a guided and structured view of the current exhibition(s) to Charleston-area K–12 students via after-school programs, youth and or community groups. Lessons relating to the exhibitions are customizable according to classroom curriculums.

Artist Lectures
Accompanying each exhibition, and, depending on the artist and their work, lectures occur in the form of a gallery walkthrough with the artist and the curator of the exhibition, or in a more formal presentation. These opportunities provide the public a chance to connect with the artist in person, ask questions, and to understand the exhibition from the artist's perspective. Additional special lectures occur throughout the year by invited visiting artists or College of Charleston faculty.

Halsey Talks
The Halsey Talks series centers on the idea of salon-style open discussions. Installments in the series cover a range of topics and are free and open to the public.

Film Screenings
The Halsey regularly screens a diverse array of films free of charge. Filmmakers are usually in attendance for a Q&A session and reception following the film.

Membership Program
The HICA's tiered membership program was established in 2004 to help support exhibitions and programming. The HICA participates in the North American Reciprocal Museum (NARM) Association, which gives members at certain levels reciprocal membership to more than 1,000 institutions nationwide. All members are invited to the Moon Party, the HICA's annual membership celebration.

Meet the Maker
Members at a certain level are invited to attend the Meet the Maker series. Meet the Maker brings in artists with upcoming shows at the Halsey to give a talk on their career and creative process.

Patron Print Program
Artists who have exhibited at the Halsey donate limited-edition prints to be featured in the Patron Print Hallway at the gallery. Members at a certain level receive their choice of one patron print a year, allowing them to grow their personal art collections while supporting the HICA. As of spring 2017, twenty-six prints have been produced by past exhibiting artists.

Publications
The Halsey has an active publishing program, often producing full-color catalogues to complement exhibitions.  HICA publications have received numerous awards from American Alliance of Museums, the American Art Libraries Association, Graphis, Communication Arts, and the South Carolina State Library. Recent publications are listed below:
 Southbound: Photographs of and about the New South (2018) 
 Force of Nature: Site Installations by Ten Japanese Artists (2007) 
 Aldwyth: work v. / work n. Collage and Assemblage 1991–2009 (2009) 
 Palmetto Portraits Project (2010)  
 Leslie Wayne: Recent Work (2011) 
 Tanja Softic: Migrant Universe (2011) 
 Aggie Zed: Keeper's Keep (2012) 
 Return to the Sea: Saltworks by Motoi Yamamoto (2012) 
 The Paternal Suit: Heirlooms from the F. Scott Hess Family Foundation (2012)  
 Pulse Dome Project: Art and Design by Don ZanFagna (2012)  
 Renée Stout: Tales of the Conjure Woman (2013) 
 Rebound: Dissections and Excavations in Book Art (2013)  
 Ruth Marten—The Unvarnished Truth: Works 2007–2013 (2014)  
 Patricia Boinest Potter: Patterns of Place (2015)  
 Something to Take My Place: The Art of Lonnie Holley (2015) 
 Sons and Father: Engravings by John McWilliams (2016) 
 Across the Threshold of India: Art, Women, and Culture (2016) 
 Jiha Moon: Double Welcome, Most Everyone's Mad Here (2017) 
 Visible Man: Fahamu Pecou (2017)  
 Bob Trotman: Business as Usual (2017)

References

Art museums and galleries in South Carolina
Museums in Charleston, South Carolina
Art museums established in 1983
Contemporary art galleries in the United States
University museums in South Carolina
College of Charleston